Maria Fátima Barone Mora (born 17 September 1999), known as Fátima Barone, is a Uruguayan footballer who plays as a centre back for Montevideo Wanderers Futbol Club and the Uruguay women's national team. She has previously played field hockey in Argentina.

International career
Barone made her senior debut for Uruguay on 6 October 2019.

Personal life
Barone's father, Deivis Barone, is a former footballer.

References 

1999 births
Living people
Women's association football central defenders
Uruguayan women's footballers
Uruguay women's international footballers
Club Nacional de Football players
Female field hockey midfielders
Uruguayan expatriate sportspeople in Argentina